USS Bonita (SF-6/SS-165), a Barracuda-class submarine and one of the "V-boats," was the third ship of the United States Navy to be named for the bonito. Her keel was laid down by the Portsmouth Navy Yard. She was launched on 9 June 1925 as V-3 (SF-6), sponsored by Mrs. L.R. DeSteiguer, wife of Rear Admiral DeSteiguer, and commissioned on 22 May 1926, Lieutenant Commander Charles A. Lockwood, Jr. in command. Like her sisters, Bonita was designed to meet the fleet submarine requirement of  surface speed for operating with contemporary battleships.

Engineering

V-3 was completed with two Busch-Sulzer direct-drive 6-cylinder 2-cycle main diesel engines of  each, along with two Busch-Sulzer auxiliary diesel engines of  each, driving electrical generators. The latter were primarily for charging batteries, but to reach maximum surfaced speed, they could augment the mechanically coupled main-propulsion engines by driving the 1,200 hp (890 kW) electric motors in parallel via an electric transmission. Although it wasn't until about 1939 that its problems were solved, electric transmission in a pure diesel-electric arrangement became the propulsion system for the successful fleet submarines of World War II, the Tambor-class through the Tench-class. Prior to recommissioning in 1940, the auxiliary diesels were replaced with two BuEng Maschinenfabrik Augsburg Nürnberg AG (MAN-designed) 6-cylinder 4-cycle diesel engines of  each. In 1942-43 Bonita was converted to a cargo submarine, with the main engines removed to provide cargo space, significantly reducing her speed on the remaining auxiliary diesels.

Service history

Interwar period
Assigned to Submarine Division 20 (SubDiv 20), V-3 cruised along the East Coast and in the Caribbean Sea until November 1927. With her division, she then transferred to the Pacific Fleet, arriving at San Diego, California, on 17 December 1927. After service with SubDivs 12 and 20 along the Pacific coast and off Hawaii, she joined SubDiv 15 of the Rotating Reserve at Mare Island Navy Yard on 1 June 1932. During this period her 5 inch (127 mm)/51 caliber deck gun was replaced by a 3 inch (76 mm)/50 caliber weapon. She was renamed Bonita on 9 March 1931 and given hull classification symbol SS-165 on 1 July 1931.

Bonita rejoined SubDiv 12 in September 1933 and cruised in Caribbean Sea, West Coast, and Hawaiian waters through 1936. She departed San Diego, California on 20 January 1937 and arrived at Philadelphia Navy Yard on 18 February. She was placed out of commission in reserve at Philadelphia, Pennsylvania on 4 June 1937.

World War II
Recommissioned on 5 September 1940, she departed New London, Connecticut on 17 November for Coco Solo, Panama Canal Zone. Bonita patrolled in the Pacific, off Panama, until she returned to Philadelphia for overhaul in October 1942.  At this time she was converted to a cargo submarine with the removal of her main engines, severely restricting her speed on the auxiliary engines.

Patrolling off the Maine coast until mid-1943, she then joined Submarine Squadron 1 (SubRon 1), SubDiv 13, on training duty out of New London. She remained on that duty until February 1945. Arriving at Philadelphia Navy Yard on 17 February, she was decommissioned 3 March and sold 28 October 1945.

Awards
 American Defense Service Medal with "FLEET" clasp
 American Campaign Medal
 Asiatic-Pacific Campaign Medal
 World War II Victory Medal

References

 Schlesman, Bruce and Roberts, Stephen S., "Register of Ships of the U.S. Navy, 1775–1990: Major Combatants" (Greenwood Press, 1991), 
 Lenton, H. T. American Submarines (Navies of the Second World War) (Doubleday, 1973), 
 Silverstone, Paul H., U.S. Warships of World War II (Ian Allan, 1965), 
 Campbell, John Naval Weapons of World War Two (Naval Institute Press, 1985), 
 Whitman, Edward C.  "The Navy's Variegated V-Class: Out of One, Many?" Undersea Warfare, Fall 2003, Issue 20
 https://web.archive.org/web/20140322093118/http://www.fleetsubmarine.com/sublist.html
 Gardiner, Robert and Chesneau, Roger, Conway's All the World's Fighting Ships 1922–1946, Conway Maritime Press, 1980. .
 Friedman, Norman "US Submarines through 1945: An Illustrated Design History", Naval Institute Press, Annapolis:1995, .
 Navsource.org USS Bonita page
 Pigboats.com V-boats page
 DiGiulian, Tony Navweaps.com 5"/51 caliber gun
 DiGiulian, Tony Navweaps.com later 3"/50 caliber gun

United States Barracuda-class submarines (1919)
V-boats
Ships built in Kittery, Maine
1925 ships
World War II submarines of the United States